Amphiarius is a genus of sea catfishes (order Siluriformes) of the family Ariidae. It includes two species, the Kukwari sea catfish, A. phrygiatus, and the softhead sea catfish, A. rugispinis.

Taxonomy
A. phrygiatus and A. rugispinis were both originally described by Achille Valenciennes in 1840 as Arius species, where they have been traditionally placed. They have also been classified in the genus Notarius. Since then, it has been recognized that these two species form a natural, monophyletic grouping and were suggested to represent a new, undescribed genus. The genus Amphiarius was finally erected for these two species in 2007.

Species
 Amphiarius phrygiatus (Valenciennes, 1840) (Kukwari sea catfish)
 Amphiarius rugispinis (Valenciennes, 1840) (Softhead sea catfish)

Distribution
Amphiarius species are distributed in marine, brackish and fresh waters of North and eastern South America.

Description
Amphiarius are distinguished from all other ariids by the presence of accessory tooth plates that are small to moderate, roughly round, and laterally located.

Ecology
Like other ariid catfishes, Amphiarius species are mouthbrooders.

Relationship to humans
Both species are caught and marketed for human consumption.

References

 

Ariidae
Fish of Brazil
Fish of French Guiana
Fish of Guyana
Fish of Suriname
Fish of Trinidad and Tobago
Fish of Venezuela
Catfish genera